The 1994–95 Philadelphia Flyers season was the Philadelphia Flyers 28th season in the National Hockey League (NHL). The Flyers made the playoffs for the first time since 1989, also winning their division for the first time since 1987, and made it to the Eastern Conference Finals before losing in six games to the New Jersey Devils.

Off-season
Bob Clarke was named president and general manager of the Flyers on June 15, 1994, replacing Russ Farwell. The Florida Panthers received the Flyers' 1994 second-round pick and cash, believed to be around $500,000, as compensation since Clarke had to be released from his contract. On June 24, Clarke hired Terry Murray to replace Terry Simpson as head coach. A former Flyers player, Murray had mostly recently coached the Cincinnati Cyclones of the International Hockey League after being fired midway through the 1993–94 season as the Washington Capitals head coach. Prior to the start of training camp, the team announced Eric Lindros was replacing Kevin Dineen as team captain.

The Flyers made three major player transactions during the off-season prior to the beginning of the 1994–95 NHL lockout. On June 29, the Flyers swapped defensemen with the Montreal Canadiens, sending Yves Racine to Montreal for Kevin Haller. On July 6, unrestricted free agent centerman Craig MacTavish, formerly of the Stanley Cup champion New York Rangers, was signed to a two-year, $1.6 million contract. On September 22, the Flyers re-acquired goaltender Ron Hextall, whom they had traded in 1992 to the Quebec Nordiques in the Lindros trade, from the New York Islanders for goaltender Tommy Soderstrom.

Regular season
After a 3–6–1 start to the season, including a shutout loss to Ottawa on February 6, Clarke dealt high-scoring winger Mark Recchi to the Montreal Canadiens for Eric Desjardins, Gilbert Dionne and John LeClair. In the following game, at home against Florida, the team lost 3–0, but Lindros and LeClair was placed on a line with sophomore forward Mikael Renberg to form the "Legion of Doom" line, a mix of scoring talent and physical intimidation. The line registered its first point on Saturday, February 11, 1995, in a game against the New Jersey Devils at the Meadowlands. The line made an immediate impact, as it helped the Flyers defeat the Devils 3–1.

Less than two weeks later, on Thursday, February 23, Lindros recorded a hat trick in what would be his final game in Quebec City against the Nordiques, but the Flyers wasted a three-goal lead into a 6–6 tie. Two nights later in Montreal, LeClair blitzed his former club in his return with a hat-trick in a 7–0 rout which saw the Flyers score five times in the third period. LeClair's previous hat trick had come just 11 days earlier in a 5–2 Flyers' win at Tampa Bay. Lindros recorded two more hat tricks during the regular season, and both came in consecutive games; his second one on March 18 in a 4–3 Flyers' overtime win in Florida, and the third on March 20 in an 8–4 Flyers' win over the Montreal Canadiens. Josef Beranek had the other Flyers' regular-season hat trick in a 5–4 overtime loss to the New York Islanders on February 2.

During the season, the Flyers had two long winning streaks: one was eight games from March 5–20, the other was nine games from April 2–22. The final contest in that streak, on April 22 at New Jersey, saw LeClair net the overtime winner which clinched the Atlantic Division. Even though it was scored 54 seconds into the overtime period, it would prove to be the fastest overtime goal scored in the lockout-shortened regular season.

The end of the season saw Lindros go down with an eye injury in the penultimate game against the New York Rangers, as a shot he took ricocheted off Rangers defenseman Jeff Beukeboom and struck him in the face.

The playoff drought was finally over as the Flyers won their first division title in eight years and clinched the No.2 seed in the Eastern Conference.

Lindros, who scored 70 points, came in second to Jaromir Jagr by a tiebreaker in the race for the Art Ross Trophy, the NHL scoring championship, but was awarded the Hart Memorial Trophy as the league's MVP.

Season standings

Playoffs
Lindros missed the first three games of the Flyers' Eastern Conference quarterfinal series against the Buffalo Sabres. Karl Dykhuis netted the overtime winner in Game 1 and the club took a 2–0 series lead on the road. Following a narrow Game 3 defeat at The Aud, Lindros returned and the reunited Legion led the club to a 4–2 win. In Game 5, Philly rolled to leads of 4–0 and 5–2 before closing with a 6–4 victory.

More overtime magic came in the semifinal series with the defending Stanley Cup champion Rangers, who upset the Nordiques in the first round. Game 1 at the Spectrum saw New York race out to a 3–1 lead, only to see the Flyers storm back to go up 4–3. A late goal from Pat Verbeek sent the game into an extra session, where Desjardins won it with a right-circle shot.

The next night, Brian Leetch recorded a hat-trick but Kevin Haller struck with under 30 seconds played in OT off a feed from Renberg to give the Flyers a 4–3 win and 2–0 series edge. The Flyers capitalized on multiple mistakes and turnovers in Games 3 and 4 at Madison Square Garden, recording 5-2 and 4-1 victories to sweep the series.

The Flyers advanced to the conference finals against the Devils. Jersey controlled long stretches of the first two games, winning 4–1 in Game 1 and overcoming an early deficit with a four-goal blitz to take Game 2, 5–2. The Devils were on the verge of going up three games to none at the Meadowlands, but a Rod Brind'Amour floater in the third period and Lindros' wrister in overtime brought the Flyers back. Philly controlled Game 4 and coasted to a 4–2 win, but the Devils continued to use the neutral zone trap to control the Legion in Game 5. Although Dineen scored early in the third to tie the game, Claude Lemieux's 50-foot blast got by Hextall and gave New Jersey the shocking 3–2 win and left the Devils one win away from the Cup finals.

In Game 6, Jim Montgomery got the Flyers on the board early in the first period, but the Devils stormed back with four consecutive scores to ice the game and the series 4–2.

Schedule and results

Regular season

|- style="background:#fcf;"
| 1 || January 21 || Quebec || 3 – 1 || Philadelphia  ||  || Hextall || 17,380 || 0–1–0 || 0 || 
|- style="background:#fcf;"
| 2 || January 22 || Philadelphia  || 1 – 4 || Boston ||  || Roussel || 14,448 || 0–2–0 || 0 || 
|- style="background:#fcf;"
| 3 || January 24 || Philadelphia || 3 – 4 || NY Islanders  ||  || Hextall || 11,487 || 0–3–0 || 0 || 
|- style="background:#cfc;"
| 4 || January 26 || Hartford  || 2 – 3 || Philadelphia ||  || Roussel || 16,557 || 1–3–0 || 2 || 
|- style="background:#cfc;"
| 5 || January 28 || Boston || 1 – 2 || Philadelphia  ||  || Roussel || 17,260 || 2–3–0 || 4 || 
|- style="background:#ffc;"
| 6 || January 29 || Philadelphia || 2 – 2 || Montreal  || OT || Hextall || 16,152 || 2–3–1 || 5 || 
|- style="background:#fcf;"
| 7 || January 31 || Philadelphia || 2 – 5 || Quebec  ||  || Hextall || 14,141 || 2–4–1 || 5 || 
|-

|- style="background:#fcf;"
| 8 || February 2 || NY Islanders  || 5 – 4 || Philadelphia || OT || Roussel || 16,519 || 2–5–1 || 5 || 
|- style="background:#cfc;"
| 9 || February 4 || Buffalo  || 2 – 4 || Philadelphia ||  || Roussel || 16,778 || 3–5–1 || 7 || 
|- style="background:#fcf;"
| 10 || February 6 || Philadelphia || 0 – 3 || Ottawa  ||  || Roussel || 9,267 || 3–6–1 || 7 || 
|- style="background:#fcf;"
| 11 || February 9 || Florida  || 3 – 0 || Philadelphia ||  || Roussel || 16,229 || 3–7–1 || 7 || 
|- style="background:#cfc;"
| 12 || February 11 || Philadelphia  || 3 – 1 || New Jersey ||  || Roussel || 19,040 || 4–7–1 || 9 || 
|- style="background:#cfc;"
| 13 || February 13 || Washington || 3 – 5 || Philadelphia  ||  || Hextall || 16,815 || 5–7–1 || 11 || 
|- style="background:#cfc;"
| 14 || February 14 || Philadelphia || 5 – 2 || Tampa Bay  ||  || Roussel || 16,699 || 6–7–1 || 13 || 
|- style="background:#fcf;"
| 15 || February 16 || Quebec || 4 – 2 || Philadelphia  ||  || Hextall || 17,065 || 6–8–1 || 13 || 
|- style="background:#ffc;"
| 16 || February 23 || Philadelphia || 6 – 6 || Quebec  || OT || Hextall || 13,301 || 6–8–2 || 14 || 
|- style="background:#cfc;"
| 17 || February 25 || Philadelphia  || 7 – 0 || Montreal ||  || Hextall || 17,800 || 7–8–2 || 16 || 
|- style="background:#cfc;"
| 18 || February 28 || Washington  || 2 – 4 || Philadelphia ||  || Hextall || 17,380 || 8–8–2 || 18 || 
|-

|- style="background:#ffc;"
| 19 || March 2 || Florida  || 2 – 2 || Philadelphia || OT || Hextall || 16,680 || 8–8–3 || 19 || 
|- style="background:#fcf;" 
| 20 || March 3 || Philadelphia || 3 – 5 || NY Rangers  ||  || Hextall || 18,200 || 8–9–3 || 19 || 
|- style="background:#cfc;"
| 21 || March 5 || Pittsburgh  || 2 – 6 || Philadelphia ||  || Hextall || 17,380 || 9–9–3 || 21 || 
|- style="background:#cfc;"
| 22 || March 7 || Philadelphia  || 4 – 3 || Tampa Bay ||  || Hextall || 21,827 || 10–9–3 || 23 || 
|- style="background:#cfc;"
| 23 || March 9 || Boston || 2 – 3 || Philadelphia  ||  || Hextall || 17,380 || 11–9–3 || 25 || 
|- style="background:#cfc;"
| 24 || March 12 || New Jersey || 3 – 4 || Philadelphia  ||  || Hextall || 17,380 || 12–9–3 || 27 || 
|- style="background:#cfc;"
| 25 || March 15 || Philadelphia  || 4 – 3 || NY Rangers ||  || Roussel || 18,200 || 13–9–3 || 29 || 
|- style="background:#cfc;"
| 26 || March 16 || Philadelphia || 3 – 1 || Ottawa  ||  || Hextall || 10,382 || 14–9–3 || 31 || 
|- style="background:#cfc;"
| 27 || March 18 || Philadelphia  || 4 – 3 || Florida || OT || Roussel || 14,703 || 15–9–3 || 33 || 
|- style="background:#cfc;"
| 28 || March 20 || Montreal || 4 – 8 || Philadelphia ||  || Hextall || 17,380 || 16–9–3 || 35 || 
|- style="background:#fcf;"
| 29 || March 22 || Philadelphia || 3 – 4 || Hartford  ||  || Hextall || 10,149 || 16–10–3 || 35 || 
|- style="background:#ffc;"
| 30 || March 25 || Philadelphia || 2 – 2 || Washington  || OT || Hextall || 16,721 || 16–10–4 || 36 || 
|- style="background:#cfc;"
| 31 || March 26 || Buffalo || 1 – 3 || Philadelphia  ||  || Roussel || 17,380 || 17–10–4 || 38 || 
|- style="background:#fcf;"
| 32 || March 28 || Philadelphia || 1 – 5 || Boston  ||  || Roussel || 14,448 || 17–11–4 || 38 || 
|- style="background:#fcf;"
| 33 || March 30 || New Jersey || 4 – 3 || Philadelphia  ||  || Hextall || 17,380 || 17–12–4 || 38 || 
|-

|- style="background:#fcf;"
| 34 || April 1 || Philadelphia || 2 – 3 || Pittsburgh  ||  || Hextall || 17,181 || 17–13–4 || 38 || 
|- style="background:#cfc;"
| 35 || April 2 || NY Rangers || 2 – 4 || Philadelphia  ||  || Hextall || 17,380 || 18–13–4 || 40 || 
|- style="background:#cfc;"
| 36 || April 6 || Tampa Bay || 4 – 5 || Philadelphia  ||  || Hextall || 17,245 || 19–13–4 || 42 || 
|- style="background:#cfc;"
| 37 || April 8 || Philadelphia || 3 – 1 || Washington  ||  || Hextall || 18,130 || 20–13–4 || 44 || 
|- style="background:#cfc;"
| 38 || April 12 || Montreal || 2 – 3 || Philadelphia  ||  || Hextall || 17,380 || 21–13–4 || 46 || 
|- style="background:#cfc;"
| 39 || April 14 || Tampa Bay  || 2 – 3 || Philadelphia ||  || Roussel || 17,380 || 22–13–4 || 48 || 
|- style="background:#cfc;"
| 40 || April 16 || Pittsburgh  || 3 – 4 || Philadelphia || OT || Hextall || 17,380 || 23–13–4 || 50 || 
|- style="background:#cfc;"
| 41 || April 18 || Philadelphia  || 3 – 1 || Florida ||  || Hextall || 14,703 || 24–13–4 || 52 || 
|- style="background:#cfc;"
| 42 || April 20 || NY Islanders || 1 – 2 || Philadelphia  || || Hextall || 17,380 || 25–13–4 || 54 || 
|- style="background:#cfc;"
| 43 || April 22 || Philadelphia  || 4 – 3 || New Jersey || OT || Roussel || 19,040 || 26–13–4 || 56 || 
|- style="background:#fcf;"
| 44 || April 23 || Philadelphia || 2 – 4 || Buffalo  ||  || Hextall || 16,230 || 26–14–4 || 56 || 
|- style="background:#fcf;"
| 45 || April 26 || Ottawa  || 5 – 2 || Philadelphia ||  || Hextall || 17,380 || 26–15–4 || 56 || 
|- style="background:#cfc;"
| 46 || April 28 || Philadelphia  || 4 – 3 || Hartford ||  || Hextall || 15,550 || 27–15–4 || 58 || 
|- style="background:#fcf;"
| 47 || April 30 || NY Rangers  || 2 – 0 || Philadelphia ||  || Roussel || 17,380 || 27–16–4 || 58 || 
|-

|- style="background:#cfc;"
| 48 || May 2 || Philadelphia || 2 – 0 || NY Islanders  ||  || Roussel || 12,621 || 28–16–4 || 60 || 
|-

|-
| Legend:

Playoffs

|- align=center bgcolor="#ccffcc"
| 1 || May 7 || Buffalo || 3 – 4 || Philadelphia || OT || Hextall || 17,380 || Flyers lead 1–0 || 
|- style="background:#cfc;"
| 2 || May 8 || Buffalo || 1 – 3 || Philadelphia ||  || Hextall || 17,380  || Flyers lead 2–0 || 
|- style="background:#fcf;"
| 3 || May 10 || Philadelphia || 1 – 3 || Buffalo || || Hextall || 13,256 || Flyers lead 2–1 || 
|- style="background:#cfc;"
| 4 || May 12 || Philadelphia || 4 – 2 || Buffalo || || Hextall || 16,230 || Flyers lead 3–1 || 
|- style="background:#cfc;"
| 5 || May 14 || Buffalo || 4 – 6 || Philadelphia || || Hextall || 17,380 || Flyers win 4–1|| 
|-

|- align=center bgcolor="#ccffcc"
| 1 || May 21 || NY Rangers || 4 – 5 || Philadelphia || OT || Hextall || 17,380 || Flyers lead 1–0 || 
|- style="background:#cfc;"
| 2 || May 22 || NY Rangers || 3 – 4 || Philadelphia || OT || Hextall || 17,380  || Flyers lead 2–0 || 
|- style="background:#cfc;"
| 3 || May 24 || Philadelphia || 5 – 2 || NY Rangers || || Hextall || 18,200 || Flyers lead 3–0 || 
|- style="background:#cfc;"
| 4 || May 26 || Philadelphia || 4 – 1 || NY Rangers || || Hextall || 18,200 || Flyers win 4–0|| 
|-

|- style="background:#fcf;"
| 1 || June 3 || New Jersey || 4 – 1 || Philadelphia || || Hextall || 17,380 || Devils lead 1–0 || 
|- style="background:#fcf;"
| 2 || June 5 || New Jersey || 5 – 2 || Philadelphia || || Hextall || 17,380  || Devils lead 2–0 || 
|- style="background:#cfc;"
| 3 || June 7 || Philadelphia || 3 – 2 || New Jersey || OT || Hextall || 19,040 || Devils lead 2–1 || 
|- style="background:#cfc;"
| 4 || June 10 || Philadelphia || 4 – 2 || New Jersey || || Hextall || 19,040 || Series tied 2–2 || 
|- style="background:#fcf;"
| 5 || June 11 || New Jersey || 3 – 2 || Philadelphia || || Hextall || 17,380 || Devils lead 3–2 || 
|- style="background:#fcf;"
| 6 || June 13 || Philadelphia || 2 – 4 || New Jersey || || Hextall || 19,040 || Devils win 4–2 || 
|-

|-
| Legend:

Player statistics

Scoring
 Position abbreviations: C = Center; D = Defense; G = Goaltender; LW = Left Wing; RW = Right Wing
  = Joined team via a transaction (e.g., trade, waivers, signing) during the season. Stats reflect time with the Flyers only.
  = Left team via a transaction (e.g., trade, waivers, release) during the season. Stats reflect time with the Flyers only.

Goaltending

Awards and records

Awards

Records

The Flyers qualified for the Stanley Cup playoffs for the first time since 1989, ending a franchise record five-year playoff drought. Goaltender Ron Hextall tied a team record for consecutive playoff wins (6) from May 12 to May 26. The team’s five consecutive road wins from May 12 to June 10 set a team playoff record (subsequently tied).

Transactions
The Flyers were involved in the following transactions from June 15, 1994, the day after the deciding game of the 1994 Stanley Cup Finals, through June 24, 1995, the day of the deciding game of the 1995 Stanley Cup Finals.

Trades

Players acquired

Players lost

Signings

Draft picks

NHL Entry Draft
Philadelphia's picks at the 1994 NHL Entry Draft, which was held at the Hartford Civic Center in Hartford, Connecticut, on June 28, 1994. The Flyers traded their first-round picks in 1993 and 1994, 10th overall, along with Steve Duchesne, Ron Hextall, Kerry Huffman, Mike Ricci, Chris Simon, the rights to Peter Forsberg, and $15 million to the Quebec Nordiques for the rights to Eric Lindros on June 30, 1992. Their second-round pick, 36th overall, was given to the Florida Panthers as compensation for the Flyers hiring Bob Clarke as their general manager. They also traded their fifth-round pick, 114th overall, and Greg Johnson to the Detroit Red Wings for Jim Cummins and the Red Wings' 1993 fourth-round pick on June 20, 1993.

NHL Supplemental Draft
Philadelphia's picks at the 1994 NHL Supplemental Draft on June 28, 1994.

Farm teams
The Flyers were affiliated with the Hershey Bears of the American Hockey League and the Johnstown Chiefs of the ECHL. Mitch Lamoureux led the Bears with 85 points as Hershey finished 2nd in their division and lost in six games to the Cornwall Aces in the first round. Johnstown finished 4th in their division and lost in the first round to the South Carolina Stingrays.

Notes

References
General
 
 
 
Specific

P
P
1994
Philadelphia
Philadelphia